Navegantes (meaning Seafarers in Portuguese) is a neighbourhood in the city of Porto Alegre, the state capital of Rio Grande do Sul, Brazil. It was created by Law 2022 from December 7, 1959, but had its limits modified due to the creation of Humaitá and Farrapos neighbourhoods by Law 6218 from November 17, 1986.

Close to Porto Alegre downtown, Navegantes was occupied by people coming from the German colonies in Rio Grande do Sul. Most of them worked as craftsmen and proletarians. In 1874, the Porto Alegre-Novo Hamburgo railroad was built and propelled its development as an industrial area.

Neighbourhoods in Porto Alegre
Populated places established in 1959